Ammoglanis natgeorum is a species of pencil catfish which was described from a marginal habitat of the lower Atabapo River, which is a left-bank blackwater tributary of the upper Orinoco River in Amazonas, Venezuela.

References

Trichomycteridae
Catfish of South America
Taxa named by Elisabeth Henschel
Taxa named by Nathan Keller Lujan
Taxa named by Jonathan N. Baskin
Fish described in 2020